Skärstad Church is a church building in Skärstad in Sweden. Belonging to the Skärstad-Ölmstad Parish of the Church of Sweden, it was built in the early 19th century, replacing a demolished 15th century church.

The first church service inside was held on 17 October 1819, while the church was officially inaugurated on 27 May 1827 by Bishop Esaias Tegnér 

Swedish theologian Johan Magnus Almqvist was a church clergyman here until his death in 1873.

References

External links

19th-century Church of Sweden church buildings
Churches in Jönköping Municipality
Churches completed in 1827
1827 establishments in Sweden
Churches in the Diocese of Växjö